Zhu Yuyue (1605 – 20 January 1647), the Prince of Tang, reigned as the Shaowu Emperor of the Southern Ming from 1646 to 1647.

Biography
He was a descendant of the first Ming emperor Zhu Yuanzhang. Before ascending to the throne he followed his father as the Prince of Tang and elder brother, the future Longwu Emperor, their fief being situated in Nanyang prefecture, in Henan province. In 1646 he succeeded the title of Prince of Tang after the accession of the Longwu Emperor.

When Qing forces captured Fuzhou in early October 1646 and killed the Longwu Emperor, he fled to Guangzhou. That December, at the behest of several high officials, he ascended to the Ming throne in Guangzhou, taking the reign title "Shaowu" (紹武; pinyin: Shàowǔ), just a few days before the Prince of Gui became the Yongli Emperor.

Both regimes claimed to be the legitimate successor of the Ming dynasty, and war broke out shortly afterwards. Initially, forces of the Shaowu regime enjoyed victory over the Yongli forces. This ultimately led to the overconfidence of the Shaowu Emperor. Corruption and lack of defense doomed the government. Just 40 days after the establishment of the Shaowu regime, Qing forces successfully invaded Guangzhou. The Shaowu Emperor was captured in January 1647 and immediately committed suicide.

The remains of the Shaowu Emperor and his officials are buried in Yuexiu Park, Guangzhou.

References

 This article is based on a translation from the Chinese Wikipedia.

1647 deaths
Southern Ming emperors
17th-century Chinese monarchs
People from Nanyang, Henan
Year of birth unknown